Shaykh Mustafa Abd ar-Rizq (1885 – 15 February 1947) was an Egyptian Islamic philosopher.

Early life 
He was born in Abu Jirj, Minya Governorate.

Career
Abd ar-Rizq succeeded Mustafa al-Maraghi as rector of al-Azhar. His appointment encountered resistance, since he was not a member of the Council of Supreme ulama: King Farouk pressured for the law to be altered to allow him to assume office. Historian Fawaz Gerges characterized ar-Rizq as a "rebel member of al-Azhar" during his era.

A follower of Muhammad Abduh, Abd ar-Rizq wanted "to prove the compatibility of traditional Islamic philosophy with the rationalism of modern thought".

His brother, Ali Abdel Raziq, was an Egyptian scholar of Islam, religious judge and government minister.

He was involved with the al-Umma party (1907–1925), an influential political party in early-20th century Egypt. He was among the contributors of al-Siyasa, newspaper of the Liberal Constitutional Party. In November 1940 Raziq was appointed minister of waqf to the cabinet led by Prime Minister Hussein Sirri Pasha.

References

Further reading
 I. M. Abu Rabi', 'Al-Azhar and rationalism in modern Egypt: the philosophical contributions of Shaykhs Mustafa 'Abd al-Raziq and 'Abd al-Halim Mahmud', Islamic Studies, vol. 27, no. 2 (Summer 1988), pp. 129–50
 G. C. Anawati and M. Borrmans, 'Le cheikh Mustafa 'Abd al-Raziq et son ecole', in Tendances et courants de l'Islam arabe contemporaine, München, 1982, pp. 30–35
 Taha Hussein, 'Le cheikh Mostafa 'Abd el-Razeq tel que je l'ai connu', Mélanges, vol. 4 (1957), pp. 249–53

1885 births
1947 deaths
Islamic philosophers
Egyptian philosophers
Grand Imams of al-Azhar
People from Minya Governorate
20th-century philosophers
Endowments Ministers of Egypt
Members of Academy of the Arabic Language in Cairo